Khamnigan is a Mongolic language spoken east of Lake Baikal.

The Khamnigan people, called the Horse Tungus or Steppe Tungus, are natively bilingual, speaking both a Mongolic and a Tungusic language, which are inherited from their mixed ancestry. This bilingualism appears to be several centuries old. Their Tungusic language is Evenki (Khamnigan is the Mongol name for the Evenki), while Khamnigan Mongol is a distinct Mongolic language, not a dialect of Mongol or Buryat as traditionally classified in Mongolia or Russia. Mongol is the dominant language; the two dialects of Evenki are only used by part of the population, and then at home.

The language has declined in Russia, with few speakers left, but both Khamnigan Mongol and Evenki bilingualism remain vigorous in China. Khamnigan Evenki, though not a distinct language from other Evenki, is heavily influenced by Mongol, especially in vocabulary. Khamnigan Mongol, on the other hand, is the most conservative Mongolic language, little different from Middle Mongolian, though the system of vowel harmony has been disrupted. There is little influence from Evenki: although Khamnigan Evenki has a grammatical plural, for example, Khamnigan Mongol does not.

Khamnigan in Mongolia has strongly assimilated to Khalkha Mongolian, and even though some Buryat-like and idiosyncratic features are to be found (e.g. the very particular mood system lacking in Khamnigan in China), it overall resembles a dialect of Khalkha, and it has lost its particular Tungusic lexicon.

See also
Hamnigan-(Hamnigan Mongols)

References

External links
Summary of Khamnigan in the World Atlas of Language Structures

Central Mongolic languages
Mongolic languages
Languages of China
Languages of Russia
Languages of Mongolia
Mixed languages